Broad Creek is a  long 4th order tributary to the Nanticoke River in Sussex County, Delaware.

Variant names
According to the Geographic Names Information System, it has also been known historically as:
Broad Creek River
Laurel River

Course
Broad Creek is formed at the confluence of Elliott Pond Branch and James Branch at Lake Pines, Delaware and then flows west into the Nanticoke River about 0.5 miles west of Cherry Walk.

Watershed
Broad Creek drains  of area, receives about 45.0 in/year of precipitation, has a topographic wetness index of 718.86 and is about 14% forested.

See also
List of Delaware rivers

References

Rivers of Delaware
Rivers of Sussex County, Delaware
Tributaries of the Nanticoke River